Russell Allen "Rusty" Wier (May 3, 1944 – October 9, 2009) was an American singer-songwriter from Austin, Texas.
Wier's career dates back to the 1960s and covers multiple music genres. Wier was the drummer in the Austin garage rock band The Wig, whose 1967 single "Crackin' Up" (a Wier composition) was included on volume 1 of the Pebbles series of compilation albums. Wier had a major local Texas hit in 1968 with "Watchout" with Gary P. Nunn and The Lavender Hill Express on Sonobeat Records. This was one of the first stereophonic 45s.

In the 1970s, Wier switched to country-rock and became a fixture on the burgeoning Austin music scene, and had a cult success with the song "I Heard You Been Layin' My Old Lady". But he is perhaps most famous for his composition "Don't It Make You Wanna Dance," which was a minor pop hit for him, but has been covered by, among others, Jerry Jeff Walker, Todd Snider, Chris LeDoux, John Hiatt, The String Cheese Incident, and Barbara Mandrell. Bonnie Raitt's version of the song was a country hit when it was included on the Urban Cowboy soundtrack. Wier was inducted into the Austin Music Awards Hall of Fame in 2002.

Death
In November 2007, Wier was diagnosed with cancer. He died on October 9, 2009, aged 65. He is survived by four children.

References

External links
Official website

1944 births
2009 deaths
Deaths from cancer in Texas
American country singer-songwriters
American male singer-songwriters
Country musicians from Texas
People from Corpus Christi, Texas
Musicians from Austin, Texas
People from Hays County, Texas
20th-century American singers
Singer-songwriters from Texas
20th-century American male singers